"I Just Wanted You to Know" is a song written by Tim Mensy and Gary Harrison and recorded by American country music singer Mark Chesnutt. It was released in November 1993 as the third single from his album Almost Goodbye. The song reached number-one on the U.S. Billboard Hot Country Singles & Tracks (now Hot Country Songs) chart and on the Canadian RPM Country Tracks chart.

Content
"I Just Wanted You to Know" is an uptempo song accompanied by fiddle, electric guitar and steel guitar. It tells of a man who keeps thinking about a woman he loved. He calls an ex-lover to talk to her, because he can't get over her.

Chart performance
The song officially debuted at number 53 on the Hot Country Singles & Tracks chart dated December 18, 1993. It charted for 19 weeks on that chart, and reached Number One on the chart dated March 5, 1994. It remained there for one week, becoming Chesnutt's fifth Number One single, and his third consecutive Number One single from his Almost Goodbye album.

Charts

Year-end charts

References

1993 singles
1993 songs
Mark Chesnutt songs
Songs written by Tim Menzies
Songs written by Gary Harrison
MCA Records singles
Song recordings produced by Mark Wright (record producer)